Casting is a manufacturing process using a fluid medium in a mould, so as to produce a casting. For casting metal, see casting (metalworking).

Casting may also refer to:

Creating a mold
 Casting, forming a protective orthopedic cast
 Casting, a process in sculpture of converting plastic materials into more solid form

Science and healthcare
 Casting (falconry), anything given to a hawk to purge and cleanse its gorge
 Casting, excretions from an earthworm
 Casting, moulting or shedding of hair in most breeds of dog and other mammals
 Casting, forming a protective orthopedic cast

Other uses
 Casting (fishing), the process of propelling a lure to catch fish
 Casting (performing arts), the process of selecting a cast of actors, or other visual talent such as models for a photo shoot
 Casting or footing, in bookkeeping, a method of summing a table of numbers by column
 Casting, to distribute a stream of data, images, sound, or voice, as in 
 Broadcasting
 Podcasting 
 Webcasting
Screen mirroring:
Miracast
Google Cast
AirPlay
 Casting, incantation of magical spells
 Casting, type conversion in computer programming
 Casting, propelling, as in casting off a boat or launching a rocket

See also
 Cast (disambiguation)
 Castang (disambiguation)
 Castaing, a surname
 Caster (disambiguation)
 Recast (disambiguation)